Parablabicentrus angustatus is a species of beetle in the family Cerambycidae, and the only species in the genus Parablabicentrus. It was described by Henry Walter Bates in 1866.

References

Desmiphorini
Beetles described in 1866
Monotypic beetle genera